Drstelja ( or ) is a settlement in the Municipality of Destrnik in northeastern Slovenia. The area is part of the traditional region of Styria. The municipality is now included in the Drava Statistical Region.

A small roadside chapel-shrine in the settlement dates to the early 20th century. The priest and poet Matija Murko (1861–1952) was born in Drstelja.

References

External links
Drstelja on Geopedia

Populated places in the Municipality of Destrnik